The Lands Valuation Appeal Court is a Scottish civil court, composed of 3 Court of Session judges. It hears cases where the decision of a local Valuation Appeal Committee is disputed.

References

See also
 Judiciary of Scotland
 Scots civil procedure

Local government in Scotland
Court of Session
Scots property law
Courts of Scotland
Land law
Land value taxation
Real estate valuation